José Roberto de Oliveira, or simply Zé Roberto (born 9 December 1980), is a Brazilian former association footballer who played as an attacking midfielder.

Career 
Zé Roberto was born in Itumbiara.

His representatives agreed to a €3 million fee with both Botafogo and FC Schalke 04 in August 2007. In January 2008 they finalised the deal and Zé Roberto joined the German side. He made his debut for Schalke 04 on 3 February 2008 scoring a goal in the 90th minute, only 33 seconds after being substituted on. On 12 December 2008, he was loaned out to Flamengo to the end of the season. On 21 October 2009, he announced his wish to stay with Flamengo after the end of his loan contract.

Flamengo
Zé Roberto made his first match for Flamengo on 4 February 2009, playing against Mesquita. After only six minutes of playing, he scored his first goal for his new club. He played 72 minutes and Flamengo won 4–1 at Maracanã Stadium.

Vasco da Gama
Zé Roberto moved to Vasco da Gama in May 2010 (effective in August), signed a contract until July 2011.

Club statistics

Flamengo career statistics
(Correct  6 December 2009)

according to combined sources on the.

Honours

Club
Botafogo
Rio de Janeiro State League: 2006

Flamengo
Rio de Janeiro State League: 2009
Brazilian Série A: 2009

Internacional
Rio Grande do Sul State League: 2011

Bahia
Bahia State League: 2012

Individual
 Campeonato Brasileiro Série A Team of the Year: 2006
 Bola de Prata: 2006

References

External links
 
 
 
 Zé Roberto at GloboEsporte 

Living people
1980 births
Association football midfielders
Brazilian footballers
Brazilian expatriate footballers
Campeonato Brasileiro Série A players
Campeonato Brasileiro Série B players
Coritiba Foot Ball Club players
Mirassol Futebol Clube players
Clube Atlético Juventus players
Cruzeiro Esporte Clube players
S.L. Benfica B players
Associação Portuguesa de Desportos players
Esporte Clube Vitória players
Kashiwa Reysol players
J1 League players
Botafogo de Futebol e Regatas players
FC Schalke 04 players
CR Flamengo footballers
CR Vasco da Gama players
Sport Club Internacional players
Esporte Clube Bahia players
Figueirense FC players
Brasiliense Futebol Clube players
Bundesliga players
Expatriate footballers in Germany
Botafogo Futebol Clube (SP) players
Sportspeople from Goiás
Expatriate footballers in Portugal
Expatriate footballers in Japan
Brazilian expatriate sportspeople in Portugal
Brazilian expatriate sportspeople in Japan
Brazilian expatriate sportspeople in Germany